Wilson Hemingway (c. 1805 - May 12, 1859) was an American politician. He was the 8th Secretary of State of Mississippi, serving from 1843 to 1847.

Biography 
Wilson Hemingway was born circa 1805, in Horry County, South Carolina. He was the son of William Hemingway and Margaret (Wilson) Hemingway. Wilson Hemingway was one of the early settlers of Carroll County, Mississippi. Hemingway became the Secretary of State of Mississippi in January 1843. His tenure in office ended in January 1847, and he was succeeded in office by Samuel Stamps. From 1847 to 1851, Hemingway was the clerk of the Mississippi High Court of Errors and Appeals (now the Supreme Court of Mississippi). After his term ended, Hemingway returned from Jackson to Carroll County. In 1850, Hemingway was one of the incorporators of the Carroll County Manufacturing Company. Hemingway died in his residence in Carroll County on May 12, 1859.

References 

1800s births
1859 deaths
People from Carroll County, Mississippi
People from Horry County, South Carolina
Secretaries of State of Mississippi